Belgun may refer to several places:

 Belgun, a village in the Bobicești Commune, Olt County, Romania
 Belgun, a village in the Kavarna Municipality, Dobrich Province, Bulgaria